A scone is a baked good, usually made of either wheat or oatmeal with baking powder as a leavening agent, and baked on sheet pans. A scone is often slightly sweetened and occasionally glazed with egg wash. The scone is a basic component of the cream tea. It differs from teacakes and other types of sweets that are made with yeast. Scones were chosen as the Republic of Ireland representative for Café Europe during the Austrian Presidency of the European Union in 2006, while the United Kingdom chose shortbread.

Lexicology 

The pronunciation of the word within the English-speaking world varies, with some pronouncing it  (rhymes with "gone"), and others  (rhymes with "tone"). The dominant pronunciation differs by area. Pronunciation rhyming with "tone" is strongest in the English Midlands and  Republic of Ireland though it seems to have less prominent patches in Cornwall and Essex. The pronunciation rhyming with "gone" is strongest in Northern England and Scotland, although this also seems to be the favoured pronunciation in Southern England, Wales, the Home Counties, and East Anglia. Natives of the Republic of Ireland and the United States mainly use the  pronunciation.  British dictionaries usually show the  form as the preferred pronunciation, while recognising the  form.

The difference in pronunciation is alluded to in a poem:

The Oxford English Dictionary reports that the first mention of the word was in 1513.

The origin of the word scone is obscure and may derive from different sources.  That is, the classic Scottish scone, the Dutch schoonbrood or "spoonbread" (very similar to the drop scone), and possibly other similarly named quick breads may have made their way onto the British tea table, where their similar names merged into one. Thus, scone may derive from the Middle Dutch schoonbrood (fine white bread), from schoon (pure, clean) and brood (bread), or it may derive from the Scots Gaelic term sgonn meaning a shapeless mass or large mouthful. The Middle Low German term schöne meaning fine bread may also have played a role in the origination of this word. And, if the explanation put forward by Sheila MacNiven Cameron is true, the word may also be based on the town of Scone in Scotland, the ancient capital of that country – where Scottish monarchs were crowned, and on whose Stone of Scone the monarchs of the United Kingdom are still crowned today.

History 
It is believed that historically scones  were round and flat, usually as large as a medium-sized plate. They were made and baked on a griddle (or girdle, in Scots), then cut into triangular sections for serving. Today, many would call the large round cake a bannock. In Scotland, the words are often used interchangeably.

When baking powder became available to the masses, scones began to be the oven-baked, well-leavened items we know today.
Modern scones are widely available in British bakeries, grocery stores, and supermarkets. A 2005 market report estimated the UK scone market to be worth £64m, showing a 9% increase over the previous five years. The increase is partly due to an increasing consumer preference for impulse and convenience foods.

Scones sold commercially are usually round, although some brands are hexagonal as this shape may be tessellated for space efficiency. When prepared at home, they may take various shapes including triangles, rounds and squares. Baking scones at home is often closely tied to heritage baking. They tend to be made using family recipes rather than recipe books, since it is often a family member who holds the "best" and most-treasured recipe.

Varieties 

British scones are often lightly sweetened, but may also be savoury. They frequently include raisins, currants, cheese or dates. In Scotland and Ulster, savoury varieties of scone include soda scones, also known as soda farls, sour dough scones known as soor dook scones made with sour milk, and potato scones, normally known as tattie scones, which resemble small, thin savoury pancakes made with potato flour. Potato scones are most commonly served fried in a full Scottish breakfast or an Ulster fry.

The griddle scone (or "girdle scone" in Scots) is a variety of scone which is cooked on a griddle (or girdle) on the stove top rather than baked in the oven. This usage is also common in New Zealand where scones of all varieties form an important part of traditional colonial New Zealand cuisine.

Other common varieties include the dropped scone, or drop scone, like a pancake, after the method of dropping the batter onto the griddle or frying pan to cook it, and the lemonade scone, which is made with lemonade and cream instead of butter and milk. There is also the fruit scone or fruited scone, which contains currants, sultanas, peel and glacé cherries, which is just like a plain round scone with the fruit mixed into the dough. To achieve lightness and flakiness, scones may be made with cream instead of milk.

In some countries one may also encounter savoury varieties of scone which may contain or be topped with combinations of cheese, onion, bacon, etc.

Scones can be presented with various toppings and condiments, typically butter, jam and cream. Strawberries are also sometimes used.

Regional variations

Australia 
Pumpkin scones, made by adding mashed cooked pumpkin to the dough mixture, had increased exposure during the period when Florence Bjelke-Petersen was in the public eye. Date scones, which contain chopped dried dates, can also be found in Australia. Another old style of cooking scones, generally in the colder months, is to deep-fry or deep pan-fry them in dripping or oil, when they are called "puftaloons".

Hungary
In Hungary, a pastry very similar to the British version exists under the name "pogácsa". The name has been adopted by several neighbouring nations' languages. Pogácsa is almost always savoury and served with varied seasonings and toppings, like dill and cheese.

New Zealand 
Scones make up a part of kiwiana, and are among the most popular recipes in the Edmonds Cookery Book, New Zealand's best-selling cook book. The Edmonds recipe is unsweetened, using only flour, baking powder, salt, butter and milk. Other ingredients such as cheese, sultanas and dates can be added.

Cheese scones are a popular snack sold in cafes or tea shops, where they are commonly served toasted with butter.

South Africa 

Scones are commonly served with clotted cream and jam; grated cheddar cheese is another popular accompaniment.

South America 

Scones are quite popular in Argentina as well as Uruguay. They were brought there by Irish, English and Scottish immigrants and by Welsh immigrants in Patagonia (Britons are the third largest foreign community in Argentina).  They are usually accompanied by tea, coffee or mate.

United States 

Scones often appear in US coffee houses. The American version is sweet, heavy, dry and crumbly, similar to British rock cakes. They are usually triangular, and often contain fruit such as blueberries or sultanas, or such flavorings as pumpkin, cinnamon or chocolate chips. They may also be topped with icing. They are often eaten as they are (not topped with butter, jam or cream), along with coffee or tea.

In Idaho and Utah, the bread products locally called "scones" are similar to Native American frybread or New Orleans beignets and are made from a sweet yeast dough, with buttermilk and baking powder or soda added, and they are fried rather than baked. They are customarily served with butter and either honey or maple syrup.

Zimbabwe 

In Zimbabwe scones are popular and often eaten for breakfast with English tea, jam and clotted cream. Originally brought to the country during its period of British colonial rule it is sometimes seen as symbolic of the country's historic link to the UK that has become Zimbabweanised.

Cultural references 
The plot of Season 10, Episode 3 of Curb Your Enthusiasm involves a heated dispute about the proper texture for scones.

In a subplot of the Derry Girls episode The Curse, Michelle decides to make scones infused with cannabis (she was originally going to do brownies, but the scone recipe was the only one her mother had) for her friends during Bridie's wake, calling them "funny scones". However, one of the guests takes them to the buffet, leading them to try and get them back and dispose of them. However, it ends up blocking the toilet, and they are kicked out of the wake after they were discovered by Eammon, Bridie's 50-year-old son. After the funeral, Granda Joe reveals that he saved some scones from the wake (he got high on one of them), and Erin looks on in horror as the rest of the family eat them.

Other usage 
In Scots the verb scon means to crush flat or beat with the open hand on a flat surface, and "scon-cap" or "scone-cap" refers to a man's broad flat cap or "bunnet".

In Australia, scone can be a slang term for the head, usually referring to the crown region.

See also 

 Biscuit (bread)
 Cream tea

References 

Scottish breads
British breads
New Zealand breads
Australian breads
British desserts
Quick breads
Sweet breads
English cuisine
British snack foods
Irish breads
American breads
Argentine cuisine
Uruguayan cuisine
South African cuisine

hu:Pogácsa